Larry Dias is a set decorator who was nominated at the 83rd Academy Awards for his work on the film Inception, this was in the category of Best Art Direction. His nomination was shared with Guy Hendrix Dyas and Doug Mowat.

He has done the sets on all of The Hunger Games films as well.

Selected filmography

 Unstrung Heroes (1995)
 While You Were Sleeping (1995)
 Disney's The Kid (2000)
 Rat Race (2001)
 Pirates of the Caribbean: The Curse of the Black Pearl (2003)
 Serenity (2005)
 Lady in the Water (2006)
 Transformers (2007)
 Indiana Jones and the Kingdom of the Crystal Skull (2008)
 Inception (2010)
 The Hunger Games (2012)
 The Hunger Games: Catching Fire (2013)
 The Hunger Games: Mockingjay – Part 1 (2014)
 The Hunger Games: Mockingjay - Part 2 (2015)

References

External links

Living people
Best Production Design BAFTA Award winners
Set decorators
Year of birth missing (living people)